Marijn de Kler (born 18 April 1994 in the Netherlands) is a Dutch footballer.

References

Dutch footballers
Living people
Association football defenders
1994 births
Achilles '29 players
Heracles Almelo players